Sheikh Hamad Abu Rabia (born 1929, died 12 January 1981) was a Bedouin Israeli politician and a member of the Knesset.

Biography
Abu Rabia was born and grew up in the Negev, where he attended elementary school. He attended high school in Hebron. At the age of 18 he became sheikh of his tribe and took interest in fostering its education.

Abu Rabia was first elected to the Knesset in 1973 on the Arab List for Bedouins and Villagers, becoming the first Bedouin to serve in the Knesset. In 1974 the party joined the Alignment, but broke away again in 1976. The following year it merged into the original United Arab List. He was re-elected in the 1977 elections, and became a member of the Committee for Public Services.

The United Arab List had won a single seat, which Abu Rabia and Jabr Muadi had agreed to rotate. However, Abu Rabia refused to vacate his seat, with a court ruling that the agreement was invalid. On 12 January 1981 Abu Rabia was assassinated outside a hotel in Jerusalem by Muadi's sons. Despite the family links to the killing, Muadi replaced Abu Rabia in the Knesset.

References

External links

1929 births
1981 deaths
Alignment (Israel) politicians
Arab List for Bedouin and Villagers politicians
Assassinated Israeli politicians
Bedouin Israelis
Bedouin members of the Knesset
Israeli people of Saudi Arabian descent
Members of the 8th Knesset (1974–1977)
Members of the 9th Knesset (1977–1981)
People from Southern District (Israel)